The Military Outstanding Volunteer Service Medal (MOVSM) is a military award which was created under Executive Order 12830 by George H. W. Bush on January 9, 1993. The medal was designed by the Institute of Heraldry and was first issued in December 1993.

General information
The MOVSM recognizes those members of the military (active duty, reserve and National Guard) who perform substantial volunteer service to the local community above and beyond the duties required as a member of the United States Armed Forces.  Such volunteer service must be made in a sustained and direct nature towards the civilian community, must be significant in nature to produce tangible results, and must reflect favorably on the military service and the United States Department of Defense.  The definition of volunteer service is left intentionally vague, allowing for a wide variety of activities and volunteer duties which would qualify a service member for the Military Outstanding Volunteer Service Medal. Typical volunteer work includes Volunteer Emergency Services (like the Civil Air Patrol, Coast Guard Auxiliary, or volunteer firefighting / EMS / Rescue Squad). Other volunteer opportunities that would qualify include Habitat for Humanity, soup kitchen work, or local, state, or federal parks and forests.

There is no specific time period to qualify for the MOVSM (for example 500 hours of community service within 24 calendar months), approval authorities will ensure the service to be honored merits the special recognition afforded by this medal. The MOVSM is intended to recognize exceptional community support over time
and not a single act or achievement. Further, it is intended to honor direct support of community activities. For the
purpose of this award, attending membership meetings or social events of a community service group is not considered
qualifying service, while manning a community crisis action telephone line is considered qualifying service.

Approval authority for award of the MOVSM is held by commanders serving in the rank of lieutenant colonel (or commander) or above. Before the recommendation is forwarded to the award approval authority, the recommender must certify that the service member meets the eligibility criteria for award of the MOVSM. Substantiating documentation, such as record of hours contributed, letters or certificates from activity supervisors, or other proof of the service member's volunteer services may be attached as enclosures to the recommendation.

The MOVSM cannot be awarded more than once during a given duty assignment or tour of duty. It may be awarded posthumously, but is not authorized for presentation to foreign personnel.

The authority governing this award is DoD Manual 1348.33-V2 December 21, 2016.

Appearance
The MOVSM is a bronze medal, 1 1/8 inches in diameter.  The obverse bears five interlaced annulets behind a five-pointed star, surrounded by a laurel wreath.  On the reverse is an oak sprig with three leaves and two acorns between the inscription OUTSTANDING VOLUNTEER SERVICE above and UNITED STATES ARMED FORCES below.

The suspension and service ribbon is 1 3/8 inches wide and consists of the following stripes: 1/8 inch bluebird; 1/8 inch goldenlight; 3/16 inch bluebird; 1/16 inch green; 5/32 inch goldenlight; center 1/16 inch green; 5/32 inch goldenlight; 1/16 inch green; 3/16 inch bluebird; 1/8 inch goldenlight; and 1/8 inch bluebird.

Multiple awards are indicated using five-pointed bronze service stars (one additional award each), and five-pointed silver service stars (five awards each).

Multiple awards

Notable recipients 

 Paul W. Brier
 William B. Caldwell IV
 Daryl Caudle
 Brian W. Cavanaugh
 Ronald P. Clark
 Charles Cooper II
 Samuel D. Cox
 James H. Dickinson
 R. Scott Dingle
 Brian S. Eifler
 Robert H. Foglesong
 William M. Fraser III
 Walter E. Gaskin
 Ronald L. Green
 Harry B. Harris Jr.
 Henry J. Hendrix
 Mark Hertling
 P. Gardner Howe III
 Tracy W. King
 Stephen J. Maranian
 John Mustin
 Samuel Paparo, Jr.
 Shane R. Reeves
 A. C. Roper
 Michael S. Rogers
 Roger A. Towberman
 Tony L. Whitehead
 David Wilson (two awards)
 Kaleth O. Wright

References

External links

Awards established in 1993
Military awards and decorations of the United States